George Purdy Radanovich (born June 20, 1955) is an American politician and former U.S. Representative for , serving from 1995 to 2011. The district includes most of northern Fresno, as well as several rural areas northeast of the city. He did not seek reelection in 2010. He is a member of the Republican Party.

Background
Radanovich was born in Mariposa, California to a Catholic family of Croatian extraction.

He was educated at California Polytechnic State University, San Luis Obispo. After college, he performed a variety of jobs, including work as a banker, substitute teacher, and construction worker. He began growing grapes in his native Mariposa County in 1982, after observing a microclimate in the area suitable for their growth. In 1986, he opened the Radanovich Winery, the first winery in the region. He was a member of the Mariposa County Board of Supervisors from 1988 to 1992, serving as chairman in 1991. He first ran for Congress in 1992 after his home in Mariposa was shifted to the 19th District, and lost in the Republican primary to Fresno businessman Tal Cloud.

Radanovich won the Republican primary in 1994. In the general election, Radanovich faced six-term incumbent Democrat Richard H. Lehman in the following November election. Lehman had only defeated Cloud by 1,100 votes in the previous election cycle, and speculation had abounded that the 19th would not stay Democratic for long. Radanovich defeated Lehman by a shocking 17-point margin (56 percent to Lehman's 39 percent). It was one of the largest margins of defeat for an incumbent in a cycle that saw many tenured Democrats lose their seats.

According to Wine Spectator, in 2003 Congressman Radanovich closed Radanovich Winery due to “the tough economic times currently facing many California wineries, the congressman said on Friday. "It has been a painful decision," said Radanovich, 47. "The past six months have been some of the most difficult that I've been through." SFGate reported on this as well saying, “Radanovich cited the current wine oversupply situation facing California vintners, the economic situation and his desire to focus on his job in Washington. The winery's tasting room has closed and some winery inventory will be sold to pay outstanding debts.”

In the 2006 election, Radanovich ran against chemical engineer T. J. Cox, who ran unopposed in the Democratic primary. Cox was arguably Radanovich's most serious and well-funded challenger since his 1994 election. However, Michael Der Manouel Jr. commented on Cox's chances for election by saying, "Cox could spend $10 million and Nancy Pelosi could spend another $10 million and Congressman Radanovich wouldn't lose."  Radanovich was reelected with 60% of the vote in 2006 and was unopposed for reelection in 2008 in what is now considered one of the most Republican districts in California. Cox was later elected to Congress in the 21st district in the 2018 elections.

On December 29, 2009, Radanovich announced he would not seek reelection in 2010.

Life after congress
In 2022 Radanovich ran for the California State Senate from District 4. He was eliminated when he ended up in 3rd place in the primaries.

Votes and positions

He was president of the Republican freshman class of 1994, has signed the Taxpayer Protection Pledge, and is a member of the Republican Study Committee.

October 6, 2005: Voted for the Department of Homeland Security.
December 14, 2005: Voted to reauthorize the Patriot Act.
June 16, 2006: Voted to reject timetables for withdrawal from Iraq.
September 29, 2008: Voted for the "Emergency Economic Stabilization Act of 2008" (Paulson Bailout Bill).

Committee assignments
Committee on Energy and Commerce
Subcommittee on Communications, Technology and the Internet
Subcommittee on Commerce, Trade and Consumer Protection (Ranking Member)
Subcommittee on Oversight and Investigations

Caucuses
 Water Caucus (Co-Chair)
 Congressional Wine Caucus (Co-Chair)
 Congressional Croatian Caucus (Co-Chair)

Family
He was married to Ethie Weaver Radanovich from November 1996 until her death from ovarian cancer on February 4, 2010. They have one son, King.

References

External links

Jim Boren, The Fresno Bee, Published on May 25, 1994, p. B3, article 8
Is Radanovich vulnerable? Jim Boren, The Fresno Bee, February 18, 2006

1955 births
American people of Croatian descent
American winemakers
County supervisors in California
California Polytechnic State University alumni
Living people
People from Mariposa, California
Republican Party members of the United States House of Representatives from California
20th-century American politicians
21st-century American politicians
Catholics from California